This is a list of television programs broadcast by Bang Bang in Albania and Kosovo. The channel was launched on December 17, 2004, and airs a mix of animated TV series, animated movies, live-action movies and live-action Albanian originals.

Current programming

Dubbed programming
 Digimon Fusion (Betejat e Dixhimonit)
 Dora and Friends: Into the City (Aventurat e Dorës dhe miqve të Saj)
 Guardians of the Galaxy (Rojtarët e Galaktikës)
 Jake and the Neverland Pirates (Xheku dhe Piratët i Ishullit të Askundit)
 Littlest Pet Shop (Dyqani i vogël i kafshëve)
 Miles from Tomorrowland (Majlsi nga e ardhmja)
 Nella the Princess Knight (Nela princesha kalorëse)
 Pretty Cure (Luftëtaret e bukura)
 Sherlock Yack (Sherlok Jak - Dedektivi i kopshtit zoologjik)
 Sheriff Callie's Wild West (Perëndimi i egër i Sherifes Keli) (also on Tibo's Ding Dong)
 Sofia the First (Sofia e parë)
 Sonic Boom (Bumi Sonik)
 Spirit Riding Free (Kali i eger Spirit)
 Tron: Uprising (Troni: Kryengritja)
 Zoofari (Udhëtim me kafshët)

Former programming

Original series
 Art Instinkt 
 Fëmijët e dijnë më mirë
 Diell
 Histori magjike
 Ne të 3 dhe xhaxha Beni
 Njerëzit, këta shpikës të çuditshëm
 Pipi
 Rreth nesh
 Shtëpiza e përrallave
 Të luajmë shkollash

Dubbed programming
 The 7D (Albanian: 7 Xhuxhat)
 A Little Snow Fairy Sugar (Sheqerka, zana e vogël e dëborës)
 The Adventures of Chuck and Friends (Aventurat e Çakut dhe Miqve të tij)
 The Adventures of Puss in Boots (Aventurat e maçokut me çizme)
 Ahoy Pirates! (Ahoj Piratët!)
 Alvinnn!!! and the Chipmunks (Alvin dhe fytyrëketrushat)
 Angel's Friends (Miqtë e ëngjëllit)
 Angus & Cheryl (Angus dhe Çeril)
 Apple and Onion (Mollë dhe Qepë)
 Art Attack (Sulmi Arti)
 Arthur's Missing Pal (Arturi dhe qenush i humbur)
 Artificial insect KABUTO BORG Victory by Victory (Kabutoborg)
 Atomic Betty (Atomike Beti)
 Austin & Ally (Austin dhe Eli)
 Baby Shark's Big Show! (Shfaqja e madhe e Bebi Shark)
 The Backyardigans (Çamarrokët e Kopshtit)
 Bananas in Pyjamas (Banane në Pizhama)
 Barney & Friends (Barni dhe miqtë)
 Barbapapa (Mjëkëroshët Barbapapa)
 Ben & Holly's Little Kingdom (Mbretëria e Vogël e Benit dhe Hollit)
 Bob the Builder (Bob Ndertuesi)
 The Boss Baby: Back in Business (Bebi Bos: Rikthim në Biznes)
 Bubble Guppies (Sirenat Gazmore)
 Bugs Bunny (Bags Bani)
 The Buzz On Maggie (Gumezhimat mbi Megin)
 Can You Teach My Alligator Manners? (Mund të më mësoni sjelljet e mia të krokodilit?)
 Captain Tsubasa (Albanian: Oli dhe Benxhi)
 Charlie and Lola (Çarli dhe Lola)
 Chip 'n' Dale (Çip dhe Dejl)
 Chip 'n Dale: Rescue Rangers (Çip dhe Dejl: Hetuesit shpëtimtarë)
 Chuggington (Çagington)
 Claude (Klodi)
 Cupcake & Dino: General Services (Kapkejk dhe Dino: Shërbimi i Përgjithshëm)
 Danny & Daddy (Deni dhe Dedi)
 Dennis & Gnasher (Denisi dhe Gnasheri)
 Dennis & Gnasher: Unleashed! (Denisi dhe Gnasheri: Shfrenuar)
 Doc McStuffins (Doktoresha e Lodrave)
 Dora the Explorer (Dora eksploruesja)
 Dougie in Disguise (Kostumet e Dagit)
 Dragon Ball Z (Sferat e Dragoit Z)
 The Emperor's New School (Kusko: Perandori Shkon në Shkollë)
 Everything's Rosie (Gjithçka është Rozi)
 Fanboy & Chum Chum (Djalë-Tifoz dhe Çam Çam)
 Fancy Nancy (Nensi Elegantja)
 Fresh Pretty Cure!
 Futari wa Pretty Cure (Luftëtaret e bukura)
 Get Ed (Kapeni Edin)
 Go, Diego, Go! (Shko Diego)
 Good Luck Charlie (Paç Fat Çarli)
 Guess with Jess (Thellë me Jess)
 Happy Monster Band (Banda e përbindëshave të lumtur)
 Heidi, Girl of the Alps (Haidi)
 Henry Hugglemonster (Henri Përbindëshi-Zemërmirë)
 Home: Adventures with Tip & Oh (Aventurat e Dyshes Tip dhe O)
 Immortal Grand Prix (Kampionati i shpejtësisë)
 In the Night Garden... (Një pasdite në kopësht)
 Inspector Gadget (Inspektori Gaxhet)
 Iron Man
 Jackie Chan Adventures (Aventurat e Xheki Çan)
 Jason and the Heroes of Mount Olympus (Xhesoni dhe Heronjtë në Zuzarët e Tyre)
 Jelly Jamm (Planeti i Muzikës)
 Jellystone! (Xhem Pelte)
 Johnny Bravo (Xhoni Bravo)
 JoJo's Circus (Jojo dhe Cirku i Mrekullueshëm)
 Jungle Junction (Një shëtitje në Xhungël)
 Kim Possible (Kim Posibëll)
 The Koala Brothers (Vëllezërit Koala, christmas special only)
 Larry-Boy: The Cartoon Adventures (Lerri-Djali)
 Les Misérables: Shōjo Cosette (Zemra e Kozetës)
 Hugtto! PreCure (Luftëtaret e dashurise)
 The Lion Guard (Garda e Luanit)
 Little Charmers (Hijeshitë e vegjël)
 Lola & Virginia (Lola dhe Virxhinia)
 LoliRock (LoliRok)
 The Looney Tunes Show (Shfaqja e Luni Tuns)
 Lost in Oz (E humbur në Oz)
 Lou & Lou: Safety Patrol (Lu dhe Lu: Patrulla e Sigurimit)
 Lucky Fred (Fredi me fat)
 Lupin III
 Magic Tiger (Tigri Magjik)
 Masha and the Bear (Masha dhe ariu)
 Matt's Monsters (Përbindëshat e Matit)
 Max & Ruby (Maksi dhe Rubi)
 Men in Black: The Series (Burra me të Zeza)
 Mice Builders (Minjtë Ndërtues)
 Mickey Mouse Clubhouse (Albanian: Miushi Miki)
 Miraculous: Tales of Ladybug & Cat Noir (Magjikët: Aventurat e Nusepashkës dhe Maçoku i zi)
 Mouk (Muk)
 My Life as a Teenage Robot (Jeta e një roboti adoleshent)
 My Little Pony: Friendship Is Magic (Miqësia është magjike me ponin tim të vogël)
 Naruto (Naruto)
 Naruto Shippuden
 The New Woody Woodpecker Show (Shfaqja e Woody Woodpecker)
 Octonauts (Oktonautët)
 PAW Patrol (Patrulla e putrave)
 The Penguins of Madagascar (Pinguinët e Madagaskarit)
 Penn Zero: Part-Time Hero (Pen Zero: Hero me kohë të pjesshme) (also on VOD)
 Peppa Pig (Derrkucja Pepa)
 Phantom Investigators (Hetuesit e Fantazmave)
 Pink Panther (Pantera Rozë)
 PJ Masks (Heronjtë në Pizhama)
 Planet Sheen (Planeti Shin)
 Pocoyo (Pokojo)
 Pokémon (Pokemon)
 Postman Pat (Postieri Pat)
 Rurouni Kenshin
 Rusty Rivets (Rasti Krijuesi)
 Sailor Moon (Luftëtaret e Hënë)
 Sailor Moon Crystal (Luftëtaret e Hënë Kristal)
 Sandra the Fairytale Detective (Sandra, Detektivja e Përrallave)
 Sanjay and Craig (Sanxhei dhe Kreg)
 Shane's Kindergarten Countdown (Çerdhja e Shejn: Me fëmijërinë e tij)
 Shanna's Show (Shfaqja e Shana)
 Shimmer and Shine (Shimeri dhe Shajni)
 Simsala Grimm (Simsala Grim)
 Sid the Science Kid (Sid, djali i vogël shkencëtar)
 Sonic The Hedgehog (Iriqi Sonik)
 Special Agent Oso (Agjenti Special Oso)
 SpongeBob SquarePants (Bob Sfungjeri Pantallona-Katrori)
 Star Twinkle PreCure (Luftëtaret e bukura: Shkëlqimi i yjeve)
 Suite PreCure
 Super Robot Monkey Team Hyperforce Go! (Skuadra e superrobotëve majmun hiperforcë)
 Team Umizoomi (Skuadra Umizumi)
 Teen Titans (Titanët e Rinj)
 Teen Titans Go! (Forca Titanët e Rinj)
 Teletubbies (Teletabis)
 Thomas and Friends (Tomas Lokomotiva dhe Shokët)
 Timothy Goes to School (Timoteu shkon në shkollë)
 Tom and Jerry (Tomi dhe Xherri)
 The Tom and Jerry Show (Shfaqja e Tomit dhe Xherrit)
 Tom and Jerry Tales (Tomi dhe Xherri)
 Trolls: The Beat Goes On! (Trolët: Ritmi Vazhdon)
 Trollhunters: Tales of Arcadia (Gjuetarët e Trolleve: Tregime të Arkadisë)
 Uki (Uki)
 Vampirina (Vampiriana)
 VeggieTales (Perimet/Perime Përbindësh)
 Vipo: Adventures of the Flying Dog (Vipo: Aventurat e Qenit Fluturues)
 Vroomiz (Makinat e vogla)
 Wallykazam! (Uallikazam!)
 Wander Over Yonder (Shëtitësi i Universit)
 Wonder Pets (Kafshët Fantastike)
 Yu-Gi-Oh! (Albanian: Ju-Gi-Oh)
 Zack & Quack (Zaku dhe Kuak)
 Zoe Wants to Be (Zoe Dëshiron të Jetë)

References

Lists of television series by network